Rhinotia is a genus of weevils in the family Belidae.

Species

Rhinotia acaciae (Lea, 1899)
Rhinotia acanthoptera (Lea, 1910)
Rhinotia acrobeles (Olliff, 1889)
Rhinotia acutipennis (Lea, 1917)
Rhinotia adelaidae (Blackburn, 1893)
Rhinotia affinis (Perroud, 1853)
Rhinotia amplicollis (Jekel, 1860)
Rhinotia anguinea (Pascoe, 1872)
Rhinotia angustata (Lea, 1917)
Rhinotia angustula (Germar, 1848)
Rhinotia aphthosa (Pascoe, 1872)
Rhinotia apicalis Zimmerman, 1994
Rhinotia bassiae (Marshall, 1936)
Rhinotia bidentata (Donovan, 1805)
Rhinotia bimaculata (Pascoe, 1871)
Rhinotia bispinosa (Perroud, 1853)
Rhinotia brevipes (Lea, 1908)
Rhinotia brunnea (Guérin-Méneville, 1838)
Rhinotia centralis (Pascoe, 1872)
Rhinotia corallina Pascoe, 1872
Rhinotia cristata (Lea, 1908)
Rhinotia cruenta Pascoe, 1870
Rhinotia cylindrica (Lea, 1917)
Rhinotia difficilis (Blackburn, 1893)
Rhinotia distincta (Blackburn, 1893)
Rhinotia divisa (Pascoe, 1885)
Rhinotia edentula (Lea, 1899)
Rhinotia elegans (Blackburn, 1893)
Rhinotia exigua (Pascoe, 1873)
Rhinotia exilis (Lea, 1917)
Rhinotia farinaria (Pascoe, 1872)
Rhinotia filiformis (Germar, 1848)
Rhinotia flindersi (Blackburn, 1893)
Rhinotia frater (Blackburn, 1893)
Rhinotia granicollis (Lea, 1908)
Rhinotia haemoptera Kirby, 1819
Rhinotia halmaturina (Lea, 1917)
Rhinotia helmsi (Blackburn, 1893)
Rhinotia hemisticta (Germar, 1848)
Rhinotia inconstans (Lea, 1908)
Rhinotia insipida (Blackburn, 1889)
Rhinotia irrorata (Jekel, 1860)
Rhinotia lacustris (Lea, 1917)
Rhinotia lineata (Donovan, 1805)
Rhinotia marginella Boheman, 1839
Rhinotia melanocephala (Boheman, 1839)
Rhinotia mimica (Lea, 1917)
Rhinotia multimaculata (Lea, 1917)
Rhinotia niveopilosa (Lea, 1908)
Rhinotia orthodoxa (Lea, 1917)
Rhinotia parallela (Pascoe, 1872)
Rhinotia parva Lea, 1908
Rhinotia perplexa (Blackburn, 1893)
Rhinotia pica (Jekel, 1860)
Rhinotia pictirostris (Lea, 1908)
Rhinotia plagiata (Pascoe, 1870)
Rhinotia podagrosa (Lea, 1917)
Rhinotia povera (Lea, 1917)
Rhinotia princeps Zimmerman, 1994
Rhinotia pruinosa Pascoe, 1871
Rhinotia pudica (Lea, 1899)
Rhinotia pulverulenta (Lea, 1908)
Rhinotia regalis (Blackburn, 1893)
Rhinotia ruficornis (Lea, 1908)
Rhinotia scalaris (Germar, 1848)
Rhinotia semipunctata (Fabricius, 1775)
Rhinotia serpens (Pascoe, 1870)
Rhinotia simplicipennis Lea, 1908
Rhinotia sparsa (Germar, 1848)
Rhinotia subparallela (Jekel, 1860)
Rhinotia subsuturalis (Lea, 1908)
Rhinotia suturalis (MacLeay, 1826)
Rhinotia tenuis (Lea, 1899)
Rhinotia ursa (Lea, 1910)
Rhinotia variabilis (Lea, 1917)
Rhinotia venusta Pascoe, 1872
Rinotia vetusta (Pascoe, 1870)
Rhinotia villosa (Lea, 1917)

References

External links 

Belidae